Mark Cameron may refer to:

 Mark Cameron (weightlifter) (born 1952), American weightlifter
 Mark Cameron (cricketer) (born 1981), Australian cricketer
 Mark Cameron (politician), New Zealand politician
 Mark Cameron (paramedic) (born 1969), Canadian paramedic